is a passenger railway station located in then city of Nishitōkyō, Tokyo, Japan, operated by the private railway operator Seibu Railway.

Lines
It is 15.3 kilometers from the terminus of the line at Seibu-Shinjuku Station.

Station layout
The station has two elevated island platforms serving four tracks, with the station building located above and perpendicular to the platforms.

Platforms

History
Higashi-Fushimi Station opened on 16 April 1927. Station numbering was introduced on all Seibu Railway lines during fiscal 2012, with Higashi-Fushimi Station becoming "SS15".

Passenger statistics
In fiscal 2019, the station was the 44th busiest on the Seibu network with an average of 24,951 passengers daily.  

The passenger figures for previous years are as shown below.

Surrounding area
 Nishitokyo City Higashifushimi Fureai Plaza
 Shin-Oume Kaido (Tokyo Metropolitan Road No. 245 Suginamida Radio)
 Fuji Kaido (Tokyo Metropolitan Road No. 8 Chiyoda Neri Mada Radio)
 Higashi Fushimi Inari Shrine-
 Musashiseki Park

See also
 List of railway stations in Japan

References

External links

Higashi-Fushimi station information 

Railway stations in Tokyo
Railway stations in Japan opened in 1927
Stations of Seibu Railway
Seibu Shinjuku Line
Nishitōkyō, Tokyo